Frank B. Desnoyers was Mayor of Green Bay, Wisconsin.

Biography
Desnoyers was born on August 7, 1859. His father, Francis, had previously been Mayor of Green Bay. He married Leila E. Lindsley, daughter of Green Bay Mayor M. P. Lindsley, in 1882. They had four children before her death on October 19, 1920. In 1923, he married Augusta Nixon of Ashland, Virginia. He died in 1945.

Political career
Desnoyers served as Mayor of Green Bay from 1896 to 1898. Later, he served as a Green Bay City Councilman and Treasurer of Brown County, Wisconsin.

References

Wisconsin city council members
Mayors of Green Bay, Wisconsin
1859 births
1945 deaths